CASR may stand for:
State highways in California, the highways in the US state of California
Centre for Automotive Safety Research, the road safety research centre based in the University of Adelaide
Calcium-sensing receptor
Civil Aviation Safety Regulation, which is set forth by the Civil Aviation Safety Authority, an Australian federal agency responsible for the regulation of private and commercial flight.
Anarchic Cell For Revolutionary Solidarity, an anarchist urban guerilla group in Bolivia